Silleda is a municipality in Galicia, Spain in the province of Pontevedra.

Access 

The town is adjacent to the N-525 road that connects Ourense with Santiago de Compostela, and 40 km from the Galician capital, Santiago. It also has access to the AP-53 highway between Santiago de Compostela and Ourense.

Boundaries 

The Serra do Candán, the mountains of Chamor, San Sebastián de Meda, and the rivers Ulla and Deza define the limits of the municipality. It borders the municipalities of Vila de Cruces to the north and east, Lalín to the east and south, and A Estrada and Forcarei to the west.

Administration 

Its 169 km² is divided into 33 parishes with many different patron saints. They are: Abades (Santa María), Ansemil (San Pedro), Breixa (Santiago), Carboeiro (Santa María), O Castro (San Mamede), Cervaña (San Salvador), Chapa (San Cibrao), Cira (Santa Baia), Cortegada (Santa María), Dornelas (San Martiño), Escuadro (San Salvador), Fiestras (San Martiño), Graba (Santa María), Lamela (San Miguel), Laro (San Salvador), Manduas (San Tirso), Margaride (San Fiz), Martixe (San Cristovo), Moalde (San Mamede), Negreiros (San Martiño), Oleiros (San Miguel), Parada (San Tomé), Pazos (San Martiño), Piñeiro (San Xiao), Ponte (San Miguel), Refoxos (San Paio), Rellas (San Martiño), Saídres (San Xoán), Siador (San Miguel), Silleda (Santa Baia), Taboada (Santiago), Vilar (San Martiño) and Xestoso (Santa María).

Local economy 

Silleda is famous for its cattle and agricultural fairs, which receive their largest international attendance during the Semana Verde de Galicia (Green Week of Galicia). The International Fair that takes place at the place created for it, which has Europe's largest roofed street.

It is a town in continuous growth, especially since the creation of the ring road and the industrial estate on the outskirts.

The town has cultural attractions (such as the Romanesque Monastery Carboeiro) and natural ones (for example the Fervenzas do Toxa, one of the tallest waterfalls in Spain).

Celebrations 

 Party of the Pie: third Saturday in August
 Doughnut Festival: Easter Sunday
 Party of the Tortilla: Friday of the first week in August
 Ham Festival: second Friday of June
 Chestnut Festival: variable date in November
 Paella Festival:
 Festival Cauldron Beef: variable date in March or April

References

External links 

 Silleda municipal web site
 Silleda tourist web site

Municipalities in the Province of Pontevedra